The 2020 Breeders' Cup Challenge series consists of horse races from around the world that provide the respective winners with an automatic "Win and You're In" Berth in the 2020 Breeders' Cup, to be held on November 6 and 7. Races are chosen by the Breeders' Cup organization and include key races in the various Breeders' Cup divisions. The Breeders' Cup organization pays the Breeders' Cup entry fee for the challenge race winners, provided they had been nominated as foals.

Summary
The selected races vary somewhat from year to year as the Breeders' Cup attempts to attract the best horses in each division. The Breeders' Cup organization normally makes an announcement in April about the races that it will add or remove from the previous year's schedule for the new year. Because of the disruption to the racing schedule caused by the COVID-19 pandemic, the Breeders' Cup organization instead made several adjustments to the normal series throughout 2020.

The 2019 Breeders' Cup Challenge series consisted of 86 races from across 11 countries. New races for 2020 include the Victoria Mile at Tokyo Racecourse (Filly & Mare Turf), Carter Handicap at Belmont Park (Sprint), Alabama Stakes at Saratoga (Distaff) and the Preakness Stakes at Pimlico (Classic).

The following races were removed from the 2020 series: Gran Premio Criadores, Gran Premio Club Hipico Falabella, Gran Premio Pamplona, Princess Rooney Handicap, John A. Nerud, Beverly D., Arlington Million, Jockey Club Derby, Cotillion and Sprinters Stakes.

On October 28, a total of 201 pre-entries were taken for the Breeders' Cup races, of which 48 horses were automatic qualifiers through the Challenge series races.

Five winners from the challenge series went on to win at the 2020 Breeders' Cup:
 Aunt Pearl won the Juvenile Fillies Turf after qualifying in the Jessamine
 Essential Quality won the Juvenile after taking the Breeders' Futurity
 Glass Slippers won the Turf Sprint after earning a berth in the Flying Five
 Tarnawa won the Turf after qualifying for the Filly & Mare Turf in the Prix de l'Opéra
 Authentic won the Classic after qualifying in the Haskell

Challenge Series races
The following table shows the Breeders' Cup Challenge races for 2020 and the respective winners. The status column shows if the winner was entered at the Breeders' Cup, and if so, whether they finished in the top three.

Television coverage
Most of the Challenge Series races were televised, either by NBC, NBC Sports, TVG or Fox Sports.

See also
2020 British Champions Series

References

Breeders' Cup Challenge
Breeders' Cup Challenge series
Breeders' Cup
Breeders' Cup Challenge